Lam Pin Min (born 1 September 1969) is a Singaporean ophthalmologist and politician and who served as Senior Minister of State for Health and Senior Minister of State for Transport between 2017 and 2020. A member of the governing People's Action Party (PAP), he was the Member of Parliament (MP) for the Sengkang West division of Ang Mo Kio GRC between 2006 and 2011, and Sengkang West SMC between 2011 and 2020. 

During the 2020 general election, his four-member PAP team led by Ng Chee Meng lost to the opposition Workers' Party (WP) team led by He Tingru in the newly-created Sengkang GRC.

Education
Lam attended Anglo-Chinese School and National Junior College before graduating from Yong Loo Lin School of Medicine at the National University of Singapore in 1993. 

After completing medical school, Lam joined the Singapore Armed Forces (SAF) as a regular medical officer in 1995. Whilst in service, he obtained his postgraduate diploma in aviation medicine from the Royal College of Physicians in 1997.

He subsequently went on to become a fellow in the Royal College of Surgeons of Edinburgh and complete a Master of Medicine degree in ophthalmology at the National University of Singapore in 2000.

Career

Military career
Lam was trained as an aviation medicine specialist and served the Republic of Singapore Air Force (RSAF) as a medical officer and flight surgeon between 1995 and 2003. He held various appointments in the RSAF, including Officer Commanding in an airbase medical centre and Branch Head of the RSAF Aeromedical Centre. He also spent 3 months serving as the medical commander of the Singapore Medical Contingent, serving in the United Nations Military Hospital in East Timor during pre-independence in 2000.

Private practice
Lam worked as a pediatric ophthalmologist at KK Women's and Children's Hospital, Singapore National Eye Centre, and Eagle Eye Centre. Lam sits on the Civil Aviation Medical Board and is the Adviser to the Society of Aviation Medicine, Singapore.

After his electoral defeat in the 2020 general election, Lam joined Eagle Eye Centre as Chief Executive Officer and Director of the Paediatric Ophthalmology and Adult Strabismus Service, and Senior Advisor of Lumens Auto on 1 September and 27 October 2020 respectively.

Political career
Lam made his political debut in the 2006 general election as part of a five-member PAP team contesting in Ang Mo Kio GRC led by Prime Minister Lee Hsien Loong and won 66.1% of the vote. 

During the 2011 general election, Lam contested in the newly-created Sengkang West SMC—which encompasses Anchorvale and Fernvale of Sengkang New Town and won 58.1% of the vote.

In January 2015, Lam was involved in a controversy in which Build-To-Order (BTO) residents in Fernvale Lea, in his constituency, were not informed of plans to build a columbarium next to their block. During a meeting with residents, Lam was spotted sitting alongside the contractors, leading to a misunderstanding that he was on their side instead of his residents'. Minister for National Development Khaw Boon Wan later informed Parliament that there will be no commercial columbarium at the site.

During the 2015 general election, Lam contested in Sengkang West SMC and won 62.1% of the vote.

Lam served as the chairman of the Government Parliamentary Committee for Health between 2009 and 2014, having previously served as the deputy Chairman between 2006 and 2008.

In August 2014, Lam was appointed Minister of State for Health.

Subsequently in May 2017, Lam was appointed Senior Minister of State for Health and Senior Minister of State for Transport.

In February 2018, it was revealed that Lam had sent an appeal letter directly to State Courts to help his resident, Tang Ling Lee, who was sentenced to one week jail for seriously injuring a motorcyclist in a road traffic accident. The High Court Judge, Justice See Kee Oon dismissed the appeal, stating that Lam's letter had misrepresented the facts and trivialised the injuries sustained by the rider. This incident led to a furor online with many netizens questioning why Lam, a legislative as well as an executive member of the government, was overstepping his duty by interfering with the judiciary. Such letters should be forwarded to the Attorney-General’s Chambers first.

During the 2020 general election, Lam contested in the newly-created Sengkang GRC—which absorbed Sengkang West SMC, Punggol East SMC and parts of Pasir Ris–Punggol GRC but lost. This is the second time the governing PAP had lost a Group Representation Constituency (GRC) to the opposition since their loss to the Worker's Party in 2011 in Aljunied GRC.

Personal life
Lam is a Singaporean Chinese of Hakka descent and has family roots in Dabu County, Guangdong, China. He has three siblings; two brothers and a younger sister. Lam is married and has two daughters.

References

External links
 lampinmin.sg (now defunct)
Archive of lampinmin.sg
 Lam Pin Min at the Parliament of Singapore website

Members of the Parliament of Singapore
People's Action Party politicians
Singaporean ophthalmologists
National University of Singapore alumni
National Junior College alumni
Anglo-Chinese School alumni
Singaporean people of Hakka descent
People from Dabu
1969 births
Living people